The Albanian-Bulgarian Protocol was a bilateral document signed in Sofia on January 9, 1932, between the Albanian Kingdom and the Kingdom of Bulgaria, concerning mutual protection for each other's minority populations. However the protocol was never ratified by Albania, and tensions over the minority issue had returned by 1933.

History 

After the establishment of diplomatic relations between both countries in 1922, the major problem in their relations, was that Albanian authorities did not recognize the status of the Bulgarian minority in Albania. This recognition would involve Albania deeper in the conflict between Sofia and Belgrade on the Macedonian Slavs. In Albanian Macedonia, due to the bulgarophile sentiments of the locals, the pro-Bulgarian, paramilitary Internal Macedonian Revolutionary Organization had its bases, from where it launched a terrorist attacks into the Kingdom of Yugoslavia. Belgrade was suspicious of the recognition of a Bulgarian minority there and was annoyed this would hinder its policy of forced “Serbianisation” in Serbian Macedonia. It had already blocked the ratification of similar protocol with Greece. However, in 1930 during the First Balkan Conference in Athens and especially on the Second Balkan Conference in Istanbul in 1931, the two delegations raised the problem of the Bulgarian minority, but were opposed by the Yugoslav side.

Nevertheless, on 9 January 1932, a Protocol on the reciprocal protection of minorities in Albania and Bulgaria was signed in Sofia by Andrey Toshev and Yanko Sakazov from Bulgarian side and by Mehmed Konica from Albanian. Both countries agreed to open schools for the teaching of the languages of the minorities and agreed to sign the so-called Balkan Pact. The protocol caused a severe reaction in the Kingdom of Yugoslavia. As result Albanian side was convinced that opposing to Belgrade over this problem was not in its interest. For this reason, the Albanian side did not support the Bulgarian side's demands for ratification of the protocol. Albanian-Bulgarian relations deteriorated completely during 1933 because in March 150 Bulgarian families were deported from the villages of Gorna and Dolna Gorica. The Bulgarian chargé d'affaires in Tirana informed his government that the plan of the Albanian government was to see all Bulgarians out of the country.

See also
 Albania–Bulgaria relations

External links
 The personal blog of Bulgarian politician  with a photocopy of the Protocol in French and its translation in Bulgarian.

References

1932 in Albania
1932 in Bulgaria
Treaties concluded in 1932
1932 documents
Albania–Bulgaria relations
Treaties of the Albanian Kingdom (1928–1939)
Treaties of the Kingdom of Bulgaria
Unratified treaties
Interwar-period treaties